RNZAF Base Ohakea is an operational base of the Royal New Zealand Air Force. Opened in 1939, it is located near Bulls, 25 km north-west of Palmerston North in the Manawatu. It is also a diversion landing point for civilian aircraft. The base's motto is Defensio per vires (Latin for defence through strength).

Early days 
An air base was originally proposed in the area in 1927, when Ohakea was selected as the most suitable site for a mooring mast for airships of the British Imperial Airship service. It was proposed to build one mast for a demonstration flight, with the potential for expansion to a full airship base with three masts, airship sheds and hydrogen production.  However, there was no point in going ahead with the development of the site without a commitment from the Australian Government to build masts to provide bases in that country. When the Australian Government declined to build masts, the New Zealand Government declined likewise.

1930s development 
In 1935 the Labour government committed to an expansion of the military air service at the expense of the navy, seeing this as a way of reducing the total defence vote.  At the end of 1935, the government accepted an air service expansion plan developed by RAF Wing Commander Ralph Cochrane.

The plan called for several new bases, with a major development at Ohakea, which would be home to 30 Wellington bombers on order for the RNZAF. Two large hangars (now hangars 2 and 3) were authorised to house the aircraft, to be designed by the Department of Public Works chief design engineer Charles Turner. Turner decided to build the hangars as monolithic reinforced concrete structures because structural steel could not be obtained in sufficient quantities without delays, while concrete and reinforcing steel could be delivered immediately.  The same limitation forced Turner to adopt concrete doors. The arched hangars spanned 61 metres, with a height of 18 metres.  The expense of the steel centring was spread across four hangars, as another two similar structures were ordered for RNZAF Base Auckland. The two Ohakea hangars were completed in 1939, at a cost of about £76,750 each.

Ultimately, the Wellington bombers for which the hangars were built never arrived, as they were donated to Britain at the start of the Second World War, forming The New Zealand Squadron.  However, the hangars have been in continuous use since their construction, and (re-roofed in steel) remain in use today.

Military service 
During the Second World War, Ohakea was the RNZAF's main training base for operational conversion to fighters, observers/navigators for medium bombers and air gunners. After the war, No. 14 Squadron RNZAF, No. 42 Squadron RNZAF and No. 75 Squadron RNZAF were re-formed at Ohakea, and No.1 Repair Depot relocated from RNZAF Base Te Rapa in Hamilton, New Zealand.

In August 1966 No. 1 Flying Training School RNZAF at Wigram was renamed Pilot Training Squadron (PTS).

After the war, Ohakea was the RNZAF's strike base, with Nos 14 and 75 Squadrons resident. A long-time resident, No 42 Squadron relocated to Whenuapai in 1984 to allow the relocation of 2 Squadron RNZAF to HMAS Albatross, Nowra, Australia in 1991. In 1993, RNZAF flying training previously carried out at Wigram by the Pilot Training Squadron RNZAF and the Central Flying School RNZAF moved to Ohakea. Also in 1993 a new aviation wing of the Royal New Zealand Air Force Museum was opened at Ohakea. 14 Squadron and 75 Squadron disbanded in November 2001, and 42 Squadron relocated back to Ohakea in January 2002. There are currently around 1200 personnel based at Ohakea, which makes it the second largest Air Force base behind RNZAF Base Auckland.

A plan to consolidate all RNZAF operations at Ohakea was abandoned in March 2009 as part of a change of policy on the part of the incoming National Government who chose to retain two operational air bases, Ohakea and Whenuapai, for use by the RNZAF.

In 2012 following the arrival of NH-90 and A-109 helicopters a new multi-purpose hangar was built to accommodate the 3 Squadron helicopter fleet. Another significant infrastructure has included a brand new main gate duty centre which the RNZAF Police and RNZAF Security Forces personnel occupy, an international air movements terminal named after Sir Richard Bolt which was completed in 2014. This allows Ohakea the ability to accommodate international civilian flights if Wellington Airport was closed.

No. 14 Squadron RNZAF reformed in 2015 to take up the initial pilot training role with the new T-6C Texan II, resulting in disbandment of the Pilot Training Squadron.

In August 2017 the Republic of Singapore Air Force based its F-16D fighters at Ohakea as a feasibility study for establishment there of a training base for its F-15 fighters. The deployment gave the RSAF opportunity to fly in more open airspace and take advantage of the unique New Zealand flying conditions and mountainous terrain not available in Singapore. However the government cancelled the plan due to cost considerations.

In December 2020, construction commenced on the new hangar, taxiways, and aircraft aprons for the four new P-8 Poseidon aircraft that were due to arrive in 2022. This will see No. 5 Squadron RNZAF consolidate all personnel and new aircraft to Ohakea from RNZAF Base Whenuapai. The first of the new aircraft arrived in December 2022, with the remaining three aircraft scheduled for May 2023.

Personnel Strength: around 1200

Flying Squadrons

Other Units
 Flying Training Headquarters 
 RNZAF Operations Squadron
 RNZAF Police
 RNZAF Security Forces
 RNZAF Logistics
 Base Medical Flight
 RNZAF Refuellers
 RNZAF Fire Rescue

Demographics

The population of Ohakea was 252 in the 2018 New Zealand census, an increase of 3 (1.2%) since the 2013 census, and an increase of 27 (12.%) since the 2006 census. There were 162 males and 87 females, giving a sex ratio of 1.86 males per female. Ethnicities were 219 people (86.9%) European/Pākehā, 27 (10.7%) Māori, 6 (2.4%) Pacific peoples, 12 (4.8%) Asian and 6 (2.4%) other ethnicities (totals add to more than 100% since people could identify with multiple ethnicities). Of the total population, 39 people (15.5%) were under 15 years old, 138 (54.8%) were 15–29, 69 (27.4%) were 30–64, and 3 (1.2%) were over 65.

Civilian functions 
Ohakea is a secondary diversion airport for heavy civilian aircraft such as the Boeing 787 and Boeing 777 if an aircraft's destination airport is temporarily closed. Ohakea has the facilities to process a significant number of passengers since the completion of a new terminal .

On 29 January 2017, an Emirates Airbus A380 was diverted to RNZAF Base Ohakea due to a Singapore Airlines Airbus A380 blocking the main runway at Auckland International Airport because of a landing gear malfunction. The Emirates A380 was refuelled by RNZAF fuel tankers and departed for Auckland. This was the first time an A380 has landed at Ohakea.

Ohakea has been the subject of a feasibility study into mixed-use military and civilian freight capability, which has included lengthening the main runway to accommodate the Boeing 747.

Motor racing

The Ohakea Airfield was used as a temporary motor racing circuit, predominantly in the 1950s. A 5.6-kilometre track hosted the inaugural New Zealand Grand Prix in 1950, while a shorter 3.5-kilometre circuit hosted the Ohakea Trophy from 1951 to 1956 and further national meetings from 1959 to 1962. The circuit was reopened for historic events in the 1980s.

References

External links

Official RNZAF Base Ohakea webpage

Ohakea
Airports in New Zealand
Manawatu District
Motorsport venues in New Zealand
New Zealand Grand Prix
Transport buildings and structures in Manawatū-Whanganui